Heaven is the third album released by brother and sister duo BeBe & CeCe Winans and their second released on Capitol Records. It reached number one on the Billboard Top Gospel Albums chart.

Track listing

Personnel 
Vocals
 BeBe Winans – lead vocals, backing vocals (1, 3, 4, 6, 7, 9)
 CeCe Winans – lead vocals, backing vocals (1-4, 6, 7, 9)
 Alvin Chea – bass vocals (1) 
 Margaret Bell – backing vocals (2, 4, 9)
 Whitney Houston – backing vocals (2), guest vocals (6)
 Claude V. McKnight III – backing vocals (4)
 Meryvn Warren – backing vocals (4, 9)
 Angie Winans – backing vocals (6)
 Debbie Winans – backing vocals (6)
 Gino Speight – backing vocals (9)
 Hezekiah Walker and the Love Fellowship Crusade Choir – backing vocals (10)
 Backing vocals on all tracks arranged by BeBe Winans and Keith Thomas, except Track 9, arranged by Meryvn Warren.

Musicians
 Keith Thomas – arrangements, synthesizers (1-9), Synclavier (1-4, 10), bass (1-4, 6, 7, 9), acoustic piano (5, 8), guitar synthesizer (6), horn arrangements (6), programming (10)
 Brett Perry – Synclavier programming (1-10) 
 Percy Bady – synthesizers (6), arrangements (6), horn arrangements (6)
 Paul Jackson Jr. – guitar (1, 3, 5, 7, 8, 9)
 Ira Siegel – guitar (2, 6)
 Tom Hemby – guitar (5)
 Jimmie Lee Sloas – bass (5) 
 Gary Lunn – bass (8)
 Mark Hammond – additional drum programming (1), drum machine programming (2, 6, 9), additional programming (3)
 Paul Leim – drums (5, 7, 8) 
 Terry McMillan – percussion (5, 7)
 Mark Douthit – saxophone (6)
 Sam Levine – saxophone (6)
 Gerald Albright – saxophone (9)
 Chris McDonald – trombone (6), horn arrangements (6)
 Mike Haynes – trumpet (6)
 George Tidwell – trumpet (6)
 Jeremy Lubbock – string arrangements (1-4, 6-10), conductor (1-10)
 Ronn Huff – string arrangements (5)
 The Nashville String Machine – strings (1-10)

Production 
 Producer – Keith Thomas 
 Executive producers – Michael Brown and Wayne Edwards
 Production assistance – Todd Moore and Brett Perry
 Recorded and mixed by Jeff Balding
 Additional engineering – Billy Whittington
 Assistant recording – Steve Bishir, Chris Bubcaz, Craig Hansen, Shawn McLean, Todd Moore, Mark Nevers, Tom Singers, Carry Summers and Kevin Twit
 Mix assistant – Carry Summers 
 Recorded at OmniSound Studios, Digital Recorders, Gold Mine Studio and Center Stage Studios (Nashville, TN); The Castle (Franklin, TN); The Hit Factory (New York, NY); Bunny Hop Studios (Los Angeles, CA).
 Mixed at OmniSound Studios and Digital Recorders.
 Mastered by Steve Hall at Future Disc (Hollywood, CA).
 Art direction – Tommy Steele
 Design – Stan Evenson Design, Inc.
 Photography – Victoria Pearson
 Management – David Sonenberg

Charts 

Singles

References

1988 albums
BeBe & CeCe Winans albums